Henry Alford (1810–1871), was an English theologian known for
Alford's Law, his rule for Biblical interpretation

Henry Alford may also refer to:
Henry Alford (police officer) (1816–1892), South Australian mounted policeman, hotelier
Henry Alford (writer) (born 1962), American humorist
Alford plea, American legal term named for Henry Alford, on trial for murder 1963 

Alford, Henry